Pawan & Pooja is a relationship-drama web series which is directed by Ajay Bhuyan and Shaad Ali. The show features Deepti Naval, Mahesh Manjrekar, Gul Panag, Sharman Joshi, Natasha Bharadwaj and Taaruk Raina. The series is available for streaming on MX Player and Season 1 was aired on 14 February 2020.

Cast
 Deepti Naval as Pooja Kalra
 Mahesh Manjrekar as Pawan Kalra
 Gul Panag as Pooja Mehra
 Sharman Joshi as Pawan Mehra
 Natasha Bharadwaj as Pooja Maheshwari
 Taaruk Raina as Pawan Srivastav
 Mrinal Dutt as Raj
 Geetika Vidya Ohlyan as Mehak

Release 
The official trailer of the web series was launched on 5 February 2020, by MX Player on YouTube. Pawan & Pooja was made available for free streaming on MX Player from 14 February 2020.

Reception 
Deccan Chronicle wrote about the series in their newspaper, "All three couples have sufficient meat in the plot to chew  on, and they make the best of it. The series maintains an emotional equilibrium , never going overboard in its quest of eyeballs. Three pairs of actors take care of the rest."

The Free Press Journal rated it 3 out of 5 and published a review saying, "The series treads an explorative path allowing the couples to exploit their hidden desires, stretching them to the extreme ends of their endurance before bringing them back from the brink. These are trends of love that are believable and immediately relatable. This series is sure to keep you interested and is the most appropriate Valentine's Day watch."

References

External links

Indian drama web series
MX Player original programming
2020 web series debuts